Petiet may refer to:

Claude Louis Petiet (1749–1806), Frenchman,  commissioner of war in 1778, elected to the Council of Elders in 1795, appointed Minister of War on 8 February 1796 and a Senator in 1806
Paul Petiet (1770–1849), French adjutant-general during the Napoleonic Wars
Auguste-Louis Petiet (1772–1858), French brigadier general and a politician.
Jules Petiet (1813–1871), French mechanical engineer who worked on the early development of the French railway